Harold Leopold Gyton (21 March 1884 – 23 August 1964) was an Australian rules footballer who played with Collingwood in the Victorian Football League (VFL).

Notes

External links 

Harold Gyton's profile at Collingwood Forever

1884 births
1964 deaths
Australian rules footballers from Victoria (Australia)
Collingwood Football Club players